After the NRM had taken power in Uganda, relations with Kenya had worsened due to Kenyan President Moi's distrust of Museveni. He suspected that the left-leaning NRM might be supporting the Mwakenya Movement, a socialist Kenyan insurgent force. It was known that the NRM allowed Mwakenya fighters to travel freely through Uganda. Kenya consequently started to fund and arm UPA insurgents. In October 1987, tensions escalated into a firefight between the NRA and the Kenya Army at the border town of Busia. In response, Museveni publicly accused Kenya of supporting anti-NRM rebels. He deployed troops to the border, officially to stop guerrillas from crossing into Uganda; Moi responded by stating that any attempts by the NRA to violate the Kenyan border would be met with force. The Kenya Times, regarded as being close to Moi, accused the NRM of supporting Kenyan rebels, spying, kidnappings of Kenyans, and cattle rustling. On 15 December 1987, at least 26 NRA soldiers were killed during an incursion into Kenya, causing the tensions to almost escalate into open war. Although the situation was defused as a result of talks organized by Mengistu Haile Mariam of Ethiopia and Ali Hassan Mwinyi of Tanzania, tensions continued.

The "Ninth of October Movement" (NOM), led by Dan Opito, ermerged around 1988. In February 1989, NOM began launching attacks into eastern and northeastern Uganda from Kenyan soil. It clashed with the NRA at Usuku. The group was suspected of links to ex-President Milton Obote. In March 1989, the Ugandan air force bombed the Kenyan town of Lokichogio. Although war was once again avoided, relations between Uganda and Kenya were not normalized until a meeting between Moi and Museveni in August 1990.

References 

1980s in Kenya
1980s in Uganda
Kenya–Uganda relations
Wars involving Kenya
Wars involving Uganda